Submission is an American erotic thriller mini-series created by Jacky St. James and Paul Fishbein, starring Ashlynn Yennie, Justin Berti, Victoria Levine and Raylin Joy. The series premiered on Showtime on 12 May 2016.

Synopsis
The series follows the journey of Ashley (Ashlynn Yennie) from being in an unhappy relationship to her exploration of BDSM when she stumbles upon an erotic novel.

Cast

Main cast
 Ashlynn Yennie as Ashley Pendleton, a young girl, recently out of a bad relationship, stumbles into the BDSM world after her interest is piqued by an erotic novel SLAVE by a mysterious novelist named Nolan Keats.
 Justin Berti as Elliott, a BDSM practitioner who works with Dylan and develops an interest in Ashley and eventually initiates her into BDSM practices.
 Victoria Levine as Jules, Ashley's friend who offers her a place to stay and has secrets of her own.
 Raylin Joy as Dylan Quinn, Jules' roommate who is into kinky sex and recruits girls for Elliott.
 Kevin Nelson as Raif, a coffee bar owner who has a mutual attraction to Ashley.
 Nika Khitrova as Scarlet, one of Jules' bosses who is, unbeknownst to her husband, having an affair with Jules. Later, Jules, Scarlet and Tomas enter into a faithful polygamous relationship.
 Brent Harvey as Tomas, Jules's boss and Scarlet's husband.

Recurring
 Richie Calhoun as Jonathan
 Sara Luvv as Maura
 Valerie Baber	 as Kimberly
 Boston Blake	 as Anthony
 Vicki Chase as Susannah
 Karla Kush as Chelsea, a member of the book club started by Dylan
 Spike Mayer as Vincent, Ashley's ex-boyfriend
 Melissa Schumacher as Tina

Development
The series co-creator, Jacky St. James, mentioned that she was unhappy with the way BDSM was portrayed in Fifty Shades of Grey, which she considers "passed off an abusive relationship as an honest interpretation of the BDSM lifestyle". She hoped to create a more nuanced view of the BDSM world with the series. In an interview with GQ, she described the series as, "imperfect people in BDSM relationships." The lead actress Ashlynn Yennie also echoed the creator's sentiment saying, "Fifty Shades of Grey was  not a correct portrayal of the type of sex that people practice. It made it seem like it was for people that were messed up or dark and it’s not at all." She hoped that the show "can shatter that glass ceiling of false belief and show the world what it truly means to trust, communicate, and finally feel free to talk about what you want and don’t want sexually in a consensual and healthy way."

The trailer for the series was released on 29 April 2016.

Episodes

Reception

Ratings
The series debuted with low viewership of 0.01 share and 55,000 viewers. However, the second episode almost doubled the viewers at 106,000 viewers and 0.02 share. The series continued its rating growth with 0.03 share and 119,000 viewers in the third week. The series finale accumulated the rating of 0.02 and 116,000 viewers.

Critical reception
Uproxx praised the series saying, "[Submission] is trying to change the way we look at late-night erotica". SheKnows also praised the show for its BDSM portrayal and said, "While Fifty Shades of Grey the movie failed to arouse interest for many, Submission is taking viewers deep into the world of BDSM — and it doesn't seem to be afraid to go there."

References

External links

2010s American drama television series
2016 American television series debuts
2016 American television series endings
Erotic television series
Showtime (TV network) original programming
BDSM-related mass media